Peter Fitzgerald may refer to:

Sir Peter FitzGerald, 19th Knight of Kerry (1808–1880), Anglo-Irish nobleman
Peter Fitzgerald (actor) (born 1962), American actor
Peter Fitzgerald (athlete) (born 1953), Australian former sprinter
Peter FitzGerald (businessman), Irish businessman, founder of Randox
Peter Fitzgerald (footballer) (1937–2013), former Irish football player
Peter FitzGerald, Irish commissioner and author of the FitzGerald Report on the assassination of Rafic Hariri
Peter Fitzgerald (politician) (born 1960), United States Senator from Illinois, 1999–2005
Peter Fitzgerald (rugby league) (born 1951), Australian rugby league player

See also
Peter Fitzgerald-Moore (1919–2004), British Canadian geologist, environmentalist and political activist